Fernando José de Matos Pinto Monteiro GCC (5 April 1942 – 8 June 2022) was a Portuguese lawyer, magistrate and judge.

He served as Attorney General of the Republic of Portugal from 2006 to 2012.

Controversies 
Suspicions were raised when Monteiro had lunch with former Prime Minister José Sócrates a few days before his arrest on 22 November 2014 on suspicion of tax fraud, money laundering, and corruption.

On 25 March 2015, he was accused over Antena 1 by the President of the Union of Magistrates of the Public Ministry António Ventinhas of  impeding investigations of politicians.

References 

1942 births
2022 deaths
Attorneys General of Portugal
20th-century Portuguese lawyers
21st-century Portuguese judges
Portuguese civil servants
People from Guarda District